Dubai Film and TV Commission (DFTC), authorizes audio and visual media production permits for TV, film and commercials in Dubai. The Commission is also mandated to increase local production and attract international players from both the film and TV sectors. DFTC has been founded on the ethos that the film and TV industry has a high multiplier effect on the macro economy, impacting the tourism, transportation, storage, financial services and construction sectors and ultimately contributing to an increase in the overall GDP of the United Arab Emirates. The Commission works closely with government entities, owners of shooting locations and other stakeholders to help production units have a seamless and cost-effective filming experience in Dubai.

On 19 July 2012, the first meeting of DFTC was held in Dubai. DFTC itself was officially set-up on 28 May 2012 through an official decree.

DFTC along with Oliver Wyman issued a whitepaper in 2013, titled Opportunities and Challenges in the Middle East and North Africa production market.

Among the feature films shoots facilitated by DFTC in Dubai, Star Trek Beyond, which filmed in key indoor and outdoor locations in Dubai in October 2015, had the biggest budget of any film to shoot in the emirate. Mission: Impossible - Ghost Protocol, which filmed in Dubai in 2011 was the costliest project, prior to this.

Board

Chairman 
Jamal Al Sharif, Managing Director, Dubai Studio City

Members 
 Issam AbdulRahim Kazim, Chief Executive Officer, Dubai Corporation for Tourism and Commerce Marketing
 Salem Bel Youha, Director, Media  Services, Government of Dubai Media Office
 Mohammed Shael Al Saadi, Chief Executive Officer, Business Registration and Licensing (BRL) sector, Department of Economic Development (DED), Government of Dubai
 Lieutenant Colonel Khabeer Mohammed Issa Al Adab, Director of the Department of Management Police, General Headquarters of Dubai Police
 Boutros Boutros, Divisional Senior Vice President, Corporate Communications, Emirates Airline & Group
 Marwan Al Ali, Senior Vice President Operations-MEASA, Jumeirah Group
 Samr Al Marzooqi, Manager, Dubai Film Market, Dubai International Film Festival
 Ahmed Abdulla Al Emadi, Director of TV and Head media production, Dubai Municipality

References 

Organisations based in Dubai
Government agencies of Dubai